Washington Township is one of the fifteen townships of Hardin County, Ohio, United States. As of the 2010 census the population was 729.

Geography
Located in the northern part of the county, it borders the following townships:
Van Buren Township, Hancock County - north
Madison Township, Hancock County - northeast
Blanchard Township - east
Pleasant Township - southeast corner
Cessna Township - south
Marion Township - southwest corner
Liberty Township - west
Orange Township, Hancock County - northwest corner

No municipalities are located in Washington Township, although the unincorporated community of Dola lies in the center of the township.

Name and history
Washington Township was organized in 1835, and named for George Washington, first President of the United States. It is one of forty-three Washington Townships statewide.

Government
The township is governed by a three-member board of trustees, who are elected in November of odd-numbered years to a four-year term beginning on the following January 1. Two are elected in the year after the presidential election and one is elected in the year before it. There is also an elected township fiscal officer, who serves a four-year term beginning on April 1 of the year after the election, which is held in November of the year before the presidential election. Vacancies in the fiscal officership or on the board of trustees are filled by the remaining trustees.

References

External links
County website

Townships in Hardin County, Ohio
Townships in Ohio
1835 establishments in Ohio
Populated places established in 1835